This is a list of episodes from the Japanese animated television series Shigofumi: Letters from the Departed. The episodes are directed by Tatsuo Satō and written by Ichirō Ōkouchi, features original character designs by Kouhaku Kuroboshi and assistant direction by Katsushi Sakurabi. The series is animated by the Japanese animation studio J.C.Staff, and produced by Bandai Visual and Genco; sound production was headed by Rakuonsha. The episodes are based on the original concept by Tomorō Yuzawa, and adapt the concept over twelve episodes. The plot of the anime follows Fumika, a mail carrier from the afterlife realm of Shigo who delivers shigofumi — letters written by people who have recently died — to people in a city in Japan.

The anime started airing on January 6, 2008 on the Chiba TV Japanese television network, with episodes airing later on numerous other UHF stations and BS11. The televised broadcast of episodes three and eight, "Friends" and "Beginning" respectively, were "altered in light of recent circumstances in the society at large," as reported on the anime's official website. Sun TV also ceased broadcast of Shigofumi episode six, and resumed broadcasting with episode seven. Other recent 2007 anime series which were changed due to current events in Japan include School Days, Higurashi no Naku Koro ni Kai, and Kodomo no Jikan.

The episodes were released in six DVD compilations in Japan by Bandai Visual between March 25 and August 22, 2008, presented on a 16:9 anamorphic frame rate, and feature two episodes each along with numerous extras, including audio commentary, liner notes, picture dramas, and Shigofumi letter sets. An original video animation episode was released as a DVD on September 26, 2008. The anime has been licensed by Bandai Visual for English language localization, and the first DVD release was originally scheduled for May 13, 2008, but was placed on hold as Bandai Visual reconsidered their release plans. The series was later released by Sentai Filmworks on August 17, 2010 in North America.

Two pieces of theme music are used for the anime; one opening theme and one ending theme. The opening theme is  performed by Ali Project, and the single was released on January 23, 2008. The ending theme, written by Saori Kodama with composition and arrangement by Pe-jun, is "Chain" performed by Snow*, and was released on February 6, 2008. The anime's original soundtrack was released on March 26, 2008; each of the albums are released by Lantis.

Episodes

References

External links
Shigofumi anime official website 

Shigofumi: Letters from the Departed